Progonia is a genus of moths of the family Erebidae. The genus was erected by George Hampson in 1896.

Species
Some species of this genus are:
Progonia acutivalva Holloway, 2008 Borneo
Progonia aenicta D. S. Fletcher, 1961 Uganda
Progonia boisduvalalis Viette, 1961 Madagascar
Progonia brunnealis (Wileman & South, 1916) Taiwan
Progonia diagonalis (Collenette, 1928) Tahiti
Progonia erectivalva Holloway, 2008 Borneo
Progonia fonteialis (Walker, 1859) Borneo, Sulawesi
Progonia grisea (Hampson, 1905) southern Africa
Progonia innupta (Collenette, 1928) Tahiti
Progonia kurosawai Owada, 1987 Japan, Sri Lanka, Nepal, Myanmar, Borneo, Sulawesi
Progonia luctuosa (Hampson, 1902) southern Africa
Progonia matilei Orhant, 2001
Progonia oileusalis (Walker, [1859]) Borneo, India, Sri Lanka, Taiwan, Japan (Ryukyu Islands), Philippines
Progonia perarcuata (Hampson, 1902)
Progonia serrativalva Holloway, 2008 Borneo
Progonia spodopa D. S. Fletcher, 1957 Solomon Islands
Progonia umbrifera (Lucas, 1894) Queensland, New Caledonia, Vanuatu, Fiji, Samoa, Tonga

References

Herminiinae